Taake is a Norwegian black metal band from Bergen, formed in 1993 and originally named Thule. The band's one continuous member is Hoest, who writes all and records most of the music. He has released seven full-length albums and several EPs. The band describes itself as "True Norwegian black metal", and Hoest said that he wants to "awaken national pride and cultural nostalgia in my Norwegian listeners" as well as to remind people "that Hell is right here on Earth and that humans can be demons". All lyrics are in Hoest's native dialect and are printed in Norse runes. Taake is the old spelling of the Norwegian word tåke, meaning "fog".

History

Early demos 

In 1993, Ørjan Stedjeberg (then known as 'Ulvhedin'), formed the first version of the band Taake under the name Thule, together with drummer 'Svartulv'. Thule released two demos, Der vinterstormene raste in 1993 and Omfavnet av svarte vinger in 1994. Shortly after, the band changed its name to Taake and 'Ulvhedin' adopted the new pseudonym 'Hoest' (meaning "autumn" or "harvest"). In 1995, they released the demo Manndaudsvinter in 1995. This was followed in 1996 by a 7" EP called Koldbrann i jesu marg.

Album trilogy (1999–2005) 

Between 1999 and 2005, Taake released three full-length albums. They are a trilogy of concept albums linked by the topics of "death, Norway, and the devil in man".

The first full-length album, Nattestid ser porten vid, was released by Wounded Love Records in 1999. The album was written entirely by Hoest, but he brought in a session musician, 'Tundra', to perform bass guitar and drums. It was recorded throughout 1997 and 1998 at the Grieg Hall.

The second installment of the trilogy, Over Bjoergvin graater himmerik, was released in 2002 by Wounded Love Records. On this record, Hoest surrounded himself with a band: second guitarist 'C. Corax', bassist and pianist 'Keridwen', and drummer 'Mutt' (Gaahlskagg, Trelldom, Sigfader).

The final installment of the trilogy, Hordalands doedskvad, was released in 2005 by Dark Essence Records. It features second guitarist 'C. Corax', bassist 'Lava' and drummer 'Mord'. It also features several guest vocalists, including 'Nattefrost' (Carpathian Forest), 'Nordavind' (Carpathian Forest) and 'Taipan' (Orcustus).

Brief hiatus and regrouping (2005–present) 

Over the following three years, Taake released four short EPs and played a few festivals (most notably the Hole in the Sky Festival in Norway, with Ivar Bjørnson of Enslaved on guitar), but according to Hoest, Taake was "on ice for a while".

Before the 2006–2007 European tour, Taake revamped their official homepage. Following the infamous March 2007 show in Essen, the band were removed from several festivals and received much backlash. At the same time, Lava, who had been bass guitarist since 2002, left the band.

In 2008, a fourth album was released, recorded entirely by Hoest and simply named Taake. The album was recorded for Hoest's own label Svartekunst Produksjoner, and was distributed via Dark Essence Records.

In 2011, Taake released the EP Kveld, featuring both new and re-recorded songs. This was followed shortly after by Taake's fifth full-length album, Noregs vaapen. Hoest collaborated with many prominent Norwegian black-metallers for this record including Attila Csihar, Nocturno Culto, Demonaz and Ivar Bjørnson. It was again released on his own label Svartekunst Produksjoner to much critical acclaim. The album was nominated for the prestigious Spellemann award in Norway for top metal release. This nomination was met with some derision due to anti-Islamic lyrics.

To mark the band's 20th anniversary, Taake released the compilation album Gravkamre, kroner og troner in 2013.

Taake played their first show in the United States in May 2014 at Maryland Deathfest in Baltimore.

In 2014, Taake released the sixth full-length album Stridens hus and the EP Kulde through Dark Essence Records. In support of this record and as a follow up to their successful show in Maryland, Taake announced an East Coast US tour for the first time in their history, to begin in June 2015.

In 2017, Taake released their seventh studio album, Kong Vinter, along with the EP Baktanker.

Taake were forced to cancel their planned 2018 US tour after Antifa activists campaigned to stop it, due to the past controversies.

Controversies 

Hoest served prison sentences for assault in 2006 and 2007, when he was aged 28–29. In March 2007, during a concert at Essen in Germany, Hoest appeared on stage in corpse paint with a swastika painted on his chest, above an inverted cross. In Germany, the use of the swastika is forbidden by law, and the remainder of Taake's German concerts were cancelled. Shortly after, Hoest stated:

Taake is not a political Nazi band [...] everyone should know by now that our whole concept is built upon provocation and anything evil [...] we truly apologize to all of our collaborators who might get problems because of the Essen swastika scandal (except for the untermensch owner of that club; you can go suck a Muslim!)

Hoest explained that he "was taking the piss" and had used the swastika only "as another symbol for evil", saying "the pentagram and inverted cross don't invoke reactions anymore". He later said "It was all about doing something extreme for the sake of it, which certainly backfired". Music writer Stuart Wain likened Hoest's stunt to how the Sex Pistols and Siouxsie Sioux wore swastikas for shock value. In January 2008, Hoest wrote:

I do realize that it is rather unforgivable to display a swastika in Germany, yes. On the other hand I strongly feel that Black Metal bands should allow themselves to use any kind of destructive/negative symbolism, as the basis of this expression is above all: Evil! Black Metal is still not, and should never become, harmless like all other styles of housebroke metal. Frankly, I find it preposterous that we get away with lyrics about murder, torture, rape, necrophilia and suicide, but get boycotted for wearing a symbol (which, by the way, has nothing to do with the band’s concept) on one single occasion. A part of our mission is to invoke negative feelings, so I found it quite appropriate to remind our German audience of their biggest shame.

Taake's nomination for the 2012 Spellemann award was criticized, due to anti-Islamic lyrics in their song "Orkan". It includes the line "Til Helvete med Muhammed og Muhammedanerne utilgivelige skikker" ("To hell with Muhammad and the Muhammadans' unforgivable customs"). Hoest noted that his lyrics are often anti-Christian, and that Christianity is mentioned in the same song. He said "our view, in the name of freedom of expression, is that it is shameful to adhere to Christianity or Islam", adding "we do not encourage either violence or racism".

Taake were forced to cancel their planned 2018 US tour after Antifa activists campaigned to stop it, due to the past controversies. Many venues cancelled the shows after being contacted and threatened by Antifa groups, and support act King Dude pulled out. Musician and activist Talib Kweli also cancelled a show at a venue where Taake was slated to perform, calling the venue "sympathetic to white nationalism". Hoest replied that "Taake is not a racist band. Never has been, never will be". He said the incident showed how "a small minority of 'left wing' agitators were able to force their agenda on the majority" through "lies, misinformation" and "threats of violence".

Discography 

 Demos
 Der vinterstormene raste (Where the winter storms raged) (1993) – released as Thule
 Omfavnet av svarte vinger (Embraced by black wings) (1994) – released as Thule
 Manndaudsvinter (Dead man's winter) (1995)
 Koldbrann i jesu marg (Gangrene in Jesus' core) (1996)

 Compilation albums

 Helnorsk svartmetall (2005) – compilation of early demos
 The Box (2005) – compilation containing Nattestid ser porten vid, Over bjoergvin graater himmerik and Helnorsk svartmetall
 Gravkamre, Kroner og Troner (2013) – compilation with alternative versions of songs, demos and previously unreleased material
 7 Fjell (2017) – compilation containing the first 7 full-length albums.
Avvik (2021) – compilation of the band's songs from the last three split albums plus an acoustic version of Nattestid ser porten vid I

 Split releases

 Sadistic Attack / Nordens doedsengel (2004) – split EP with Amok
 A Norwegian Hail to Von (2006) – split with Norwegian Evil, Amok and Urgehal
 Men of Eight / Lagnonector (2006) – split single with Vidsyn
 Dra Til Helvete! (2006) – split EP with Gigantomachy
 Swine of Hades (2011) – split EP with Sigh, The Meads of Asphodel, Thus Defiled and Evo/Algy
 Pakt (2020) – split EP with Whoredom Rife
 Jaertegn (2020) – split EP with Deathcult
 Henholdsvis (2021) – split EP with Helheim

Personnel

Current members
 Hoest – composer, all instruments, vocals (1993–present)

Live members
 V`gandr – bass (2007–present)
 Aindiachaí – guitar (2007–present)
 Gjermund – guitar (2007–present)
 Rune – drums (2019–present)

Past members
 Svartulv – drums (1993–1996), vocals (2004, 2005)
 Dim (aka O.D.Smau) – vocals (1995)
 C. Corax – guitars (2004–2006)
 Keridwen – bass, piano (2000–2003; died 2015)
 Mord – drums (2002–2006)
 Lava – bass (2002–2007)
 Haavard – bass (unknown time period)

Guest musicians/past live members
 Thurzur – drums
 Skagg - guitar
 C. Corax – guitar
 Taipan – vocals
Nattefrost – vocals
 Nordavind – vocals
 Discomforter – vocals
 Utflod – piano
 Støver – "whispers"
 John Boyle - war cry
 Ivar Bjørnson - guitar
 Nocturno Culto - vocals
 Attila Csihar - vocals
 Demonaz Doom Occulta - vocals
 Skagg - vocals
 Bjørnar E. Nilsen - vocals, mellotron
 Gjermund - guitar solos, banjo, mandolin
 Niklas Kvarforth - vocals
 Ciekals - additional guitar

References

External links 

 
 Taake | Dark Essence Records | Dark Essence Records
 

Norwegian black metal musical groups
Musical groups established in 1993
1993 establishments in Norway
Musical groups from Bergen
One-man bands